The Secret of The Secret is book written by journalist Karen Kelly which explores the explosive success of the book The Secret and the people and ideas behind it. It was published in 2007 by Thomas Dunne Books.

References 

2007 non-fiction books
Books about books
Thomas Dunne Books books